Anderton Glacier is a tributary glacier,  long, descending the south slopes of the Eisenhower Range to enter Reeves Glacier between Mount Matz and Andersson Ridge, in Victoria Land, Antarctica. The glacier is situated on the Pennell Coast, a portion of Antarctica lying between Cape Williams and Cape Adare. It was mapped by the United States Geological Survey from surveys and from U.S. Navy air photos, 1955–63, and was named by the Advisory Committee on Antarctic Names for Peter W. Anderton, a glaciologist at McMurdo Station, summer 1965–66.

See also
 List of glaciers in the Antarctic
 Glaciology

References 

Glaciers of Victoria Land